Choqa Sabz may refer to:
Chaqa Sabz
Choqa Sabz-e Naqd-e Ali
Choqa-ye Sabz